Loving Pablo, Hating Escobar is a 2007 memoir by Colombian author and journalist Virginia Vallejo about her five-year (1982-1987) romantic relationship with Pablo Escobar, head of the Medellín Cartel. It was published by Random House Mondadori on 22 September 2007, and Random House Inc. of New York on 4 October 2007.

The book, upon release, instantly became the #1 bestseller in Colombia, Latin America, and the Hispanic market in the United States. It has been translated to sixteen languages, and inspired the 2017 film Loving Pablo.

Vallejo's memoir, in addition to covering the relationship, also serves as an intimate biography of Escobar, and a historical document about Colombian tragedies and political corruption in the second half of the 20th century.

Plot
The book is divided in an introduction and three parts: The Days of Innocence and Dreams; The Days of Splendor and Terror; and The Days of Absence and Silence.

In the Introduction, Virginia Vallejo describes her departure from Colombia on 18 July 2006 in a special flight of the US Drug Enforcement Administration (DEA), after she has accused a former senator and minister of justice, Alberto Santofimio, of instigating the assassination of a former presidential candidate, Luis Carlos Galan, and after she had offered her cooperation to the Department of Justice in ongoing high-profile criminal cases.

The story begins with the joy and passion of two new lovers -Pablo, an ambitious rookie politician from humble origins, and Virginia, a socialite and media personality, both 32 years old- and continues with the evolution of their relationship and Escobar's personality during his war against the extradition treaty between Colombia and the United States, and the terrorist activities of him and the Medellin cartel in their last years.

Like a snowball, Vallejo describes the birth and boom of the cocaine industry that turned her lover into a billionaire, thanks to the cooperation of leading politicians; the origins of the Colombian rebel organizations, and the paramilitary squads founded by Escobar and his partners; the assassinations of the justice minister Rodrigo Lara in 1984, and the siege of the Palace of Justice in 1985; the suffering of the journalist after she had ended her relationship with the drug kingpin in 1987, and her cooperation with the anti drug German agency BKA in 1988; the Cuban connection, and the bombing of an airplane with 110 people on board in 1989 (Avianca Flight 203); the assassination of Luis Carlos Galán, and three more presidential candidates; the origins of Escobar's war against the Cali cartel and the Colombian state, followed by the era of narcoterrorism from 1988 to 1993; the coalition of enforcement agencies and Escobar's enemies involved in his hunt; and, finally, the worldwide reaction to the death of the Number One Enemy of the United States on 2 December 1993.

Reaction
The release of the book created a political scandal in Latin America and the Hispanic television channels in the US, due to Vallejo's description of the relationship of Pablo Escobar and the Medellin and Cali cartels with several presidents - like Alvaro Uribe, Alfonso López and Ernesto Samper - and Colombian enforcement agencies. Thanks to Vallejo's revelations, the Colombian government reopened the so-called "cases of the century": the siege of the Palace of Justice, followed by a massacre of more than 100 people, including eleven Supreme Court Justices, committed by the army; and the assassination of Luis Carlos Galan in 1989.

Vallejo's book was commented on by The New York Times and El País of Madrid, among hundreds of media worldwide. Also, by Colombian, Venezuelan and Ecuadorian presidents, a former American ambassador to Bogota, human rights organizations, and the rebel FARC.

In 2008 and 2009, president Rafael Correa of Ecuador showed "Amando a Pablo, odiando a Escobar" on television.

Political asylum to the author
On 3 June 2010, the United States of America granted political asylum to the Colombian author under the precepts of the American Constitution, the Geneva Convention Against Torture, and the Universal Declaration of Human Rights. The decision of the judge was based on Virginia Vallejo's career of decades as a journalist; her testimonies under oath in historic criminal cases that resulted in lengthy convictions; her description of atrocities and massacres in her book and in the court; the threats that she had received from members of the Colombian Government and the paramilitary; and the brutal character assassination of the journalist in media owned by presidential families or their powerful associates, all of them documented in hundreds of pages of evidence and later erased from the Internet.

Translations
According to the author's agent, Liepman AG of Zürich, the book "Amando a Pablo, odiando a Escobar" will be released in foreign languages during 2017. The countries and publishers are, in alphabetical order:
 Brazil, Globo livros.
 Czech Republic, Euromedia Group.
 Denmark, Rosinante.
 Egypt, Al Arabi Publishing.
 Finland, Like Publishing.
 France, J’ai lu (of Flammarion).
 Germany, Lübbe.
 Greece, Psichogios Publications.
 Hungary, Partvonal (of Melotrade).
 Italy, Giunti Editore.
 Poland, Agora SA.
 Portugal, Penguin Random House Portugal.
 Romania, Grup Media Litera.
 Russia, Eksmo.
 Slovakia, Aktuell.
 Spain and Latin America, Peninsula (of Planeta).
 Turkey, Mona Kitap.
 United Kingdom, Canongate.
 United States, Vintage and Vintage Español (of Knopf Doubleday/Penguin Random House).

The Greek, Polish, Brazilian, Dutch and Finnish books were released in the first semester of 2017; the rest came out in late 2017 and early  2018. Planeta released "Amando a Pablo, odiando a Escobar" in Spain on 25 October 2017. The Latin American releases have not been confirmed yet. Vintage-Knopf Doubleday launched both the Spanish  and English titles in North America on 29 May 2018.

Film adaptation
The film Loving Pablo is based on Vallejo's book, and was released on 6 September 2017 during the 74th Venice Film Festival. The role of Vallejo is played by Penélope Cruz, while Escobar is played by her husband Javier Bardem, both winners of the Oscar of the Academy of Hollywood as best supporting actors.

References

External links
 About the book
 About the author, Virginia Vallejo

2007 non-fiction books
2017 non-fiction books
Memoirs
Biographies (books)
Random House books
Doubleday (publisher) books
Non-fiction books about Pablo Escobar
Non-fiction books about Colombian drug cartels
History books about crime
Books about Colombia
Memoirs adapted into films